The Bathurst District Soldiers' War Memorial Carillon is located in Bathurst, New South Wales, on Kings Parade between Russell Street and Church Street. The Carillon consists of 47 bells, an original arrangement of 35 with an additional 12 added in 2018, and was constructed in 1933 as a memorial to the men and women of Bathurst who served in both World War I and World War II. The memorial also contained a gas-fuelled eternal flame until replaced by a bronze sculpture in 2019.

History 
On 25 August 1926 The National Advocate printed a column detailing the proposal made by Mr. R. H. Browning for a memorial consisting of a tower containing 23 bells, at an expected cost of £10,000 for the tower and £5,000 for the bells. After seven years of construction, costing £8000, the memorial was unveiled on 12 November 1933.

Plaques 
There are two plaques on the side of the memorial, both commemorating the 50th anniversary of the end of World War II – the first unveiled by Peter Wellington, and the other unveiled by Doreen Smith. Inside the building many more plaques have been erected to commemorate sacrifices made by service men and women.

See also
 List of carillons

References

External links 

Carillons
World War II memorials in Australia
Bathurst, New South Wales
World War I memorials in Australia
1933 establishments in Australia